The 2007–08 Syrian Premier League is the 37th season of the Syrian Premier League, Syria's premier football league. It began on 27 September 2007.

Al-Wathba and Qardaha were relegated from the previous season.
Afrin and Al-Nawair moved up from the Syrian League 1st Division.

Premier League Teams (2007-2008)

Final league standings

Top goal scorers
The top scorers from the Syrian Premier League 2007–08 are as follows:

External links
Details at goalzz.com

Syrian Premier League seasons
1
Syria